National Highway 325 (NH 325) is a National Highway in India that connects Balotra, Rajasthan, with Sanderao, Rajasthan. This highway connects NH 25 in Balotra to NH 62  in Sanderao.

Route 
Balotra, Siwana, Bishangarh, Jalore, Ahore, Takhatgarh, Sanderao.

Junctions  

Terminal with National Highway 25 near Balotra.

Terminal with National Highway 62 near Sandera.

See also 

 List of National Highways in India by highway number

References

External links 
 NH 325 on OpenStreetMap

National Highways in Rajasthan
National highways in India
Pali district